Leanne Pooley ONZM is a Canadian filmmaker based in Auckland, New Zealand. Pooley was born and raised in Winnipeg, Manitoba, Canada, she immigrated to New Zealand in the mid-1980s and began working in the New Zealand television and film industry before moving to England where she worked for many of the world's top broadcasters (BBC, Channel 4, PBS, Discovery etc.).  She returned to New Zealand in 1997 and started the production company Spacific Films.  Her career spans more than 25 years and she has won numerous international awards (including the People's Choice Award for Documentary at the Toronto International Film Festival in 2009).  Leanne Pooley was made a New Zealand Arts Laureate in 2011 and an Officer of the New Zealand Order of Merit in the New Year's Honours List 2017.  She is a member of The Academy of Motion Picture Arts and Sciences.

2022 saw Pooley move from directing to producing with three documentaries released.  Feature Film "Dame Valerie Adams: More Than Gold", "Beyond Conversion" for TVNZ and "Fightback:Joseph Parker" for streaming platform DAZN.

In 2020 Pooley directed two feature documentaries.  "We Need To Talk About A.I." for Universal Pictures and GFC films and "The Girl on the Bridge" for Augusto Entertainment and the NZ Film Commission. The former explores the existential risk and exponential benefits of Artificial General Intelligence. The latter follows suicide survivor and activist Jazz Thornton as she confronts teenage suicide head on.

In 2015 Pooley's animated WW1 Feature "25 April" premiered at the Toronto International Film Festival before screening at film festivals around the world. "25 April"  was the first New Zealand movie to be in contention for an Academy Award for animation.

In 2013 Leanne directed  Beyond the Edge, a 3D feature film about the 1953 Ascent of Everest by Edmund Hillary and Tensing Norgay.  The film was a runner-up for the People's Choice Award for Documentary at the Toronto International Film Festival.

In 2009 Pooley made the documentary The Topp Twins: Untouchable Girls, a theatrical feature about the lives of lesbian, singing, twin sister comedy duo, the Topp Twins. The film has won 21 International Awards including at the Toronto International Film Festival, the Melbourne International Film Festival, the Gothenburg International Film Festival, the Seattle Film Festival, New Doc New York, The Nashville Film Festival and the Florida Film Festival among others. It also won Best Feature at the NZ Film & TV Awards, and reached just under $2 million at the New Zealand box office.

Previous documentaries include; Being Billy Apple released in 2007 about the legendary pop turned conceptual artist who used his own identity to explore the concept of artist as art object and whose idea driven works about branding and 'art and life' broke new ground in London and New York; Shackleton's Captain, a documentary about Frank Worsley, captain of Shackleton's Endurance, The Man Who Has Everything for the American Discovery Network, Kiwi Buddha as seen on National Geographic and Haunting Douglas, described by Variety Magazine as an "Expertly crafted video portrait of modern dancer/choreographer Douglas Wright". Haunting Douglas earned Pooley the "Best Director" award at the 2005 New Zealand Screen Awards. Pooley made The Promise about the life of euthanasia advocate, Leslie Martin, winning the "Best Documentary" award at the 2006 New Zealand Screen Awards. Her documentary Try Revolution explores how rugby was used to help end apartheid in South Africa and featured among others Archbishop Desmond Tutu.

Pooley's production company is Spacific Films based in Auckland, New Zealand.

Leanne serves as a judge for The International Academy of Television Arts & Sciences; EMMY Awards.  She has taught documentary at various universities and filmschools and is an active member of the New Zealand Director’s Guild and The Academy of Motion Picture Arts and Sciences.  Leanne lives in Auckland with her husband and two children.

Filmography 

DIRECTOR We Need To talk about AI - GFC - Universal Pictures - 2020
The pros and cons of Artificial General Intelligence.

DIRECTOR: The Girl On The Bridge - Augusto - NZFC - 2020
The story of mental health activist and suicide survivor Jazz Thornton.

DIRECTOR 25 April (2015) - General Film Corporation - NZFC - 2015
An animated feature documentary about the WW1 Gallipoli campaign.

DIRECTOR" "Beyond the Edge" - General Film Corporation - NZFC - 2013
A 3D feature film about the 1953 Ascent of Everest by Edmund Hillary and Tensing Norgay.

PRODUCER: "Finding Mercy" - Spacific Films - 2012 TVNZ/The Knowledge Network - 2012
A heart breaking documentary about two little girls and a friendship that came to represent the lost promise of Zimbabwe.

DIRECTOR: "Shackleton's Captain" - Gebrueder-Beetz/Making Movies - TVNZ/ZDF/ARTE - 2012
A Dramatised documentary about Frank Worsley, Captain of Ernest Shackleton's ill-fated Endurance expedition.  Starring Craig Parker.

DIRECTOR: The Topp Twins: Untouchable Girls - Diva Productions - 2009
A documentary film about New Zealand entertainers the  Topp Twins which has won over 20 international awards including the "Cadillac People's Choice Award" at the Toronto International Film Festival.  It is the most successful documentary ever made in New Zealand.

DIRECTOR/PRODUCER: "Being Billy Apple" - Spacific Films - 2007
Television New Zealand
A profile of the artist known as Billy Apple who was at the forefront of both the POP and Conceptual art movements and who alongside the likes of Andy Warhol helped to redefine the meaning of the word artist.

DIRECTOR/PRODUCER: TRY REVOLUTION – Spacific Films - 2006
Television New Zealand /  M-Net (South Africa) /  SBS (Australia)
How rugby helped to bring down Apartheid in South Africa featuring Archbishop Desmond Tutu.

DIRECTOR/PRODUCER:  THE PROMISE – Spacific Films -2005
Television New Zealand / CBC (Canada) /  LINK (USA) / TPS (Taiwan)
Feature-length documentary following the incredible journey of Leslie Martin, the euthanasia advocate who was convicted of attempting to murder her mother. 
Winner "Best Documentary" and "Best Camera" 2006 NZ Screen Awards.
Winner "Special Mention" Feature Length Documentary DocNZ 2005.
Screened "Input 2006" (Taiwan) selected "Best Of Input" (Brazil).

DIRECTOR/PRODUCER:  HAUNTING DOUGLAS – Spacific Films - 2003
Television New Zealand / ABC (Australia) /  YLE (Finland)
Feature-length documentary about the life and work of Douglas Wright, one of the world’s greatest dancer/choreographers.   Screened NZ Film Festival, San Francisco Film Festival (finalist Golden Gate Awards), Sydney Film Festival, Dance on Camera Festival-New York, Reel Dance  Festival-Sydney, Vancouver Film Festival, Commonwealth Film Festival – Manchester, Cinedans- Amsterdam, IMZ – Brighton, Golden Prague, Reel Affirmations - Washington, Festival de Cine de Granada. 
Winner "Best Director" and "Best Editor"  2005 NZ Screen Awards.
Winner "Best Documentary" Reel Dance Awards 2004 Sydney

PRODUCER:  THE MAN WHO HAS EVERYTHING - NHNZ - 2001
Discovery Health (International)
A ground breaking docudrama about men’s health issues.

PRODUCER:   KIWI BUDDHA - Spacific Films - 2000
National Geographic (International) / TV3 (New Zealand) / Danish Public Broadcasting / 
RTÉ (Ireland) / Israel  / Korea  / France
The story of Rinpoche, the Southern Hemisphere’s first Buddhist High Lama

DIRECTOR/PRODUCER:  RELATIVE GUILT  - Spacific Films - 1999
TV3 (New Zealand)
Guilt by association, the family of a murderer.  
Winner "Best Documentary" 1999 Qantas Media Awards.

DIRECTOR/PRODUCER:  EVERYMAN - "PAPABILE" – BBC Manchester - 1997
BBC / ( over 50 Territories)  
A docudrama examining the ancient process of Papal elections.

DIRECTOR: MODERN TIMES-"RELATIVE STRANGERS" – Mosaic Films - 1997
BBC (UK)
Exploring the complicated nature of our relationship with in-laws.

DIRECTOR: EYEWITNESS  - "Pond & River "  - Café Productions –1996
BBC / OPB (PBS America) / (over  80 territories)
Part of the Emmy Award-winning series combining history, science,  and mythology with nature.

DIRECTOR: EVERYMAN "The Silent Export" - BBC Manchester- 1995
BBC (UK)
A docudrama exploring the experiences of Irish Women who travel to England  for abortions.

DIRECTOR: BIG SCIENCE (X4)  -Wall to Wall Productions – 1994
BBC (UK)
A weekly series exploring the moral, ethical and philosophical implications of modern science.

DIRECTOR:  DEADLINE (X6)   -  Real Life Productions – 1994
Channel 4 (UK)
A 6-part behind-the-scenes look at the sometimes bizarre world of a regional news channel.

DIRECTOR/PRODUCER: EVERYMAN -"GODS CANDIDATES" – BBC Manchester - 1994                       
BBC (Worldwide)  various territories
A documentary about Vatican politics.

DIRECTOR:  BRAVE NEW WORLD – Open Media – 1994
Channel 4 (UK)
A  science film investigating the implications of genetic research on reproductive technology.

DIRECTOR/CAMERA: 40 MINUTES-"WILL THEY RING" - MOSAIC PICTURES – 1993
BBC (Worldwide) various territories
A documentary about the problems faced by patients waiting for organ  transplants.

DIRECTOR/CAMERA: 40 MINUTES - "A Change of Heart" –Mosaic Pictures - 1993 
BBC (Worldwide) various territories
A  look at the issues surrounding the use of pig’s organs for human transplantation.                     
                
DIRECTOR/CAMERA:  INSIDE TRACK ON PARENTING - LWT – 1993
ITV (UK)
An informative magazine programme about the trials of parenting.

DIRECTOR/CAMERA:  FIRST HAND – First Hand Productions - 1990-92
Television New Zealand 
A series documenting the lives of extraordinary New Zealanders.

Industry associations 

The Academy of Motion Picture Arts and Sciences
The Screen Director’s Guild of New Zealand
The New Zealand Arts Foundation - Arts Laureate 2011

Further reading
 Upfront: Leanne Pooley, New Zealand Listener
 Haunting Douglas: A pound of Douglas's flesh, New Zealand Listener
 Dance on Camera: Haunting Douglas, Variety Magazine
 Thomas Crow on Billy Apple (1935-2021) https://www.artforum.com/print/202201/thomas-crow-on-billy-apple-87438

References

External links 
 Spacific Films Website
 Biography for Leanne Pooley on NZ On Screen along with an interview from April 2009 on ScreenTalk.
  NZ Arts Foundation Profile
 TVNZ Artist Profile
 Pooley on IMDb

New Zealand film producers
Living people
Year of birth missing (living people)
Film directors from Winnipeg
Canadian emigrants to New Zealand
New Zealand women film directors
New Zealand documentary filmmakers
Canadian documentary film directors
Canadian women film directors
Officers of the New Zealand Order of Merit
New Zealand women film producers
Canadian women documentary filmmakers